Mohammad Bagher Kharazi (born 26 June 1961) is an Iranian cleric and a candidate for the presidential elections held in June 2013. His nomination was rejected by Guardian Council.

Early life and education
Kharrazi was born on 26 June 1961. He was educated in Qom.

Career and political activities
Kharazi is secretary general of Hezbollah of Iran. He was appointed to this post in 1990. He owns a daily with the same name with the organization. He is a religious teacher and one of his students is Mojtaba Khamenei.

He run for the presidential elections that was held in 2013. He was registered for the elections on 9 May 2013. However, his candidacy was rejected by Iran's Guardian Council on 21 May 2013.

Views
In February 2013, Kharazi claimed "If I am elected as president, I will return the lands of Tajikistan, Armenia and Azerbaijan, which were separated from Iran." Iran lost these lands to the Tsardom of Russia in the 19th century.

References

1961 births
Living people
People from Qom
Iranian Islamic religious leaders